Stord is a municipality in Vestland county, Norway. It is located in the traditional district of Sunnhordland. Stord is sometimes called "Norway in miniature" since it has such a variety of landscapes: coastline, fjords, forests, agricultural land, and mountain areas. The administrative centre of the municipality is the town of Leirvik, which is also the largest town in the municipality and the whole region of Sunnhordland. Leirvik was declared a town in 1997. Other population centres in the municipality include the large village of Sagvåg and the smaller villages of Litlabø and Grov.

The  municipality is the 316th largest by area out of the 356 municipalities in Norway. Stord is the 69th most populous municipality in Norway with a population of 18,919.

General information

The parish of Stordøen was established as a municipality on 1 January 1838 (see formannskapsdistrikt law). In 1863, the northern district of the municipality (population: 2,313) was separated to become the new municipality of Fitjar. On 15 May 1868, the southern district of Stordøen located on the mainland (population: 900) was separated to form the new municipality of Valestrand. On 1 January 1898, the southern part of the island of Huglo (population: 117) was transferred from the neighboring municipality of Fjelberg to Stord. On 1 January 1970, the small uninhabited part of the island of Stord along the Valvatnavågen that belonged to Bømlo was transferred to Stord municipality.

Name
The municipality is named after the large island of Stord. The name is old and it was (and still is) used in Icelandic literature meaning "ground" or "earth". Before 1889, the name was written "Stordøen".

Coat of arms
The coat of arms was granted on 19 June 1987. The arms show a yellow twig of holly on a red background. The holly was chosen since it is a common tree in the municipality. The designer was Truls Nygaard.

Churches
The Church of Norway has two parishes within the municipality of Stord. It is part of the Sunnhordland prosti (deanery) in the Diocese of Bjørgvin.

Geography
Stord is located on the southern half of the island of Stord (the northern part is part of Fitjar Municipality). The municipality also includes the islands of Huglo Storstøya, Nautøya, and Føyno. The Hardangerfjorden runs along the southern border of the island municipality, separating it from the municipalities of Kvinnherad, Vindafjord, and Sveio. The Langenuen strait runs along the eastern side, separating it from Tysnes municipality. The Stokksundet and Digernessundet straits runs along the western border, separating it from the municipality of Bømlo. The mountain Mehammarsåto is the highest point in the municipality.

History

The battle of Stord was fought on or by this island between the Norwegian king Hakon Haraldsson and the Danish king Harald "Bluetooth" Gormsson, supported by Hakon's brother's sons led by Harald "Greycloak" Eiriksson.

Economy
The 3 largest private employers in Stord municipality are: Kværner, Wärtsilä Norway AS and Leirvik AS. Together these three companies employ more than 3000 people.

Kværner Stord, situated south of Leirvik on the peninsula of Eldøyane, is the largest yard in Norway. Aker Stord has built the biggest oil production platforms in the world, Gullfaks C and Troll.

Transport

An extensive tunnel and bridge system, the Triangle Link, connected Stord to the mainland on 27 December 2000 and to the neighboring island of Bømlo on 30 April 2001. The bridges involved are the Bømla Bridge and Stord Bridge and the tunnel is the Bømlafjord Tunnel. The airport in Stord is Stord Airport, Sørstokken, is located northwest of Sagvåg on the Sørstokken peninsula. On 10 October 2006, Atlantic Airways Flight 670 skidded off the runway at the airport. Four people died.

Healthcare
Stord Hospital is a local hospital for the municipalities in Sunnhordland, with a total of around 50,000 inhabitants. The hospital has specialist health services in medicine, surgery, X-ray, and gynecology. Stord District Psychiatric Center (DPS) is close by and has specialist health services within mental health care for adults and children. Stord ambulance station has premises in the same area and Sunnhordland inter-municipal emergency room is co-located with the hospital.

Government
All municipalities in Norway, including Stord, are responsible for primary education (through 10th grade), outpatient health services, senior citizen services, unemployment and other social services, zoning, economic development, and municipal roads. The municipality is governed by a municipal council of elected representatives, which in turn elect a mayor.  The municipality falls under the Haugaland og Sunnhordland District Court and the Gulating Court of Appeal.

Municipal council
The municipal council of Stord is made up of 35 representatives that are elected to four year terms. The party breakdown of the council is as follows:

Mayor
The mayors of Stord (incomplete list):
2017–present: Gaute Straume Epland (Ap)
2015-2017: Harry Herstad (Ap)
2007-2015: Liv Kari Eskeland (H)
1991-2007: Magne Rommetveit (Ap)

Notable people 

 Lars Eskeland (1867–1942) a Norwegian educator, writer and proponent of Nynorsk
 Olaf Lange (1875–1965) a Norwegian painter who visualised the complexity of the modern urban life with symbolistic paintings; lived in Stord around 1950
 Olaf Kullmann (1892–1942) a Norwegian naval officer and then peace activist
 Magne Rommetveit (1918–2009) a Norwegian lexicographer
 Ragnar Rommetveit (1924–2017) a Norwegian psychologist and academic
 Ivar Eskeland (1927–2005) a Norwegian philologist, publisher, translator, biographer, literary critic, newspaper editor, theatre worker and radio personality
 Hans J. Røsjorde (born 1941) a politician and County Governor of Oslo and Akershus 2001 to 2011
 Jan Kåre Hystad (born 1955) a Norwegian jazz musician, plays saxophone, clarinet and flute
 Rune Belsvik (born 1956) a Norwegian novelist, playwright, short story writer and children's writer
 Magne Rommetveit (born 1956) a politician, Mayor of Stord, 1992–2007
 Ole Jacob Hystad (born 1960) a Norwegian jazz musician, plays tenor saxophone and clarinet
 Janove Ottesen (born 1975) a Norwegian musician, sings and plays guitar and barrels
 Synnøve Macody Lund (born 1976) a Norwegian journalist, film critic, model and actress
 Obtained Enslavement (formed 1989 in Stord - 2000) a black metal band from Stord

Sport 
 Geirmund Brendesæter (born 1970) a Norwegian former footballer with nearly 300 club caps
 Gro Espeseth (born 1972) a former Norwegian footballer, with 105 caps for Norway women
 Odd Christian Eiking (born 1994) a Norwegian cyclist
 Anders Mol (born 1997) a Norwegian beach volleyball player

References

External links

Municipal fact sheet from Statistics Norway 

 
Municipalities of Vestland
1838 establishments in Norway